Sun Zarra is a 2006 Hindi-language Indian film directed by Rohit Nayyar, starring Samir Aftab, Anjana Sukhani, Kishori Shahane and Mithun Chakraborty in an extended special appearance.

Cast 
 Samir Aftab
 Anjana Sukhani
 Kishori Shahane
 Mithun Chakraborty

Soundtrack 
"Dil Ki Sun Zarra"

External links 
 

2006 films
2000s Hindi-language films